Hari Shankar Bhabhra (born 6 August 1928) is a former speaker of the Rajasthan legislative assembly. He attained the office of the Speaker from 16 March 1990 to 5 October 1994 (two times). He won the state legislative elections in  1985, 1990, and 1993 from Ratangarh in Churu district. A resident of Didwana in Nagaur district, he contested and won from Ratangarh constituency of Churu District. He is a state leader of the Bharatiya Janata Party. He was also Deputy Chief Minister of Rajasthan from 6 October 1994 to 1 December 1998. Bhabhra was the deputy chairperson of Economic Policy and Reform Council in the Rajasthan Government. He was a member of the Rajya Sabha in 1978–84.

Early life

Hari Shankar Bhabhra was born in Khirki Darwaja, Didwana at Nagaur District on 6 August 1928. His father's name was Shri Mannalal Bhabhra and mother's name was Smt. Mohini Devi. Shri Bhabhra married Smt. Yasoda Devi on 3 July 1941, and they have two sons and three daughters. He obtained his Bachelor of Arts and law degree from Nagpur Law College, as well as Prabhakar, Hindi Bhasha Sangh High School, Nagpur.
Harishankar Bhabhada some family living are in Nagpur & Kamptee (Juni Oli Kamptee) Badrinarayan Dwarka Prasad Bhabhada.

External links
Former Speakers of Rajasthan Legislative Assembly
India E-News:Rajasthan to announce new hotel policy

Living people
Rajasthani people
Speakers of the Rajasthan Legislative Assembly
People from Churu district
1928 births
Deputy chief ministers of Rajasthan
Bharatiya Janata Party politicians from Rajasthan
Rajya Sabha members from the Bharatiya Janata Party